Whipped cream is heavy cream that is whipped by a whisk or mixer until it is light and fluffy and holds its shape, or by the expansion of dissolved gas, forming a firm colloid. It is often sweetened, typically with white sugar, and sometimes flavored with vanilla. Whipped cream is also called Chantilly cream or crème Chantilly .

Fat content
The cream used as whipping cream has a high butterfat content—typically 30%–36%—as fat globules contribute to forming stable air bubbles.

During whipping, partially coalesced fat molecules create a stabilized network which traps air bubbles. The resulting colloid is roughly double the volume of the original cream. If, however, the whipping is continued, the fat droplets will stick together destroying the colloid and forming butter.  Lower-fat cream (or milk) does not whip well, while higher-fat cream produces a more stable foam.

Methods of whipping

Cream is usually whipped with a whisk, an electric hand mixer, or a food processor. Results are best when the equipment and ingredients are cold. The bubbles in the whipped cream immediately start to pop, and it begins to liquefy, giving it a useful lifetime of one to two hours. Many 19th-century recipes recommend adding gum tragacanth to stabilize whipped cream, while a few include whipped egg whites.  Various other substances, including gelatin and diphosphate, are used in commercial stabilizers.

Instant 

Whipped cream may also be made instantly in a aerosol can or in a whipping siphon with a whipped-cream charger. A gas dissolves in the butterfat under pressure. When the pressure is released, the gas leaves solution, producing bubbles. The gas is typically nitrous oxide, as carbon dioxide tends to give a sour taste. Other names for cream sold in an aerosol can are skooshy cream (Scottish), squirty cream, spray cream, or aerosol cream. A common brand in the United States is Reddi-Wip. In some jurisdictions, sales of canned whipped cream are limited to avoid potentially dangerous nitrous oxide abuse.

Flavorings 

Whipped cream is often flavored with sugar, vanilla, coffee, chocolate, orange, and so on.

History

Whipped cream, often sweetened and aromatised, was popular in the 16th century, with recipes in the writings of Cristoforo di Messisbugo (Ferrara, 1549), Bartolomeo Scappi (Rome, 1570), and Lancelot de Casteau (Liège, 1604). It was called milk or cream snow (neve di latte, neige de lait, neige de crème).  A 1545 English recipe, "A Dyschefull of Snow", includes whipped egg whites as well, and is flavored with rosewater and sugar (cf. snow cream). In these recipes, and until the end of the 19th century, naturally separated cream is whipped, typically with willow or rush branches, and the resulting foam ("snow") on the surface would from time to time be skimmed off and drained, a process taking an hour or more. By the end of the 19th century, centrifuge-separated, high-fat cream made it much faster and easier to make whipped cream.

The French name crème fouettée 'whipped cream' is attested in 1629, and the English name "whipped cream" in 1673. The name "snow cream" continued to be used in the 17th century.

Various desserts consisting of whipped cream in pyramidal shapes with coffee, liqueurs, chocolate, fruits, and so on either in the mixture or poured on top were called crème en mousse 'cream in a foam', crème fouettée, crème mousseuse 'foamy cream', mousse 'foam', and fromage à la Chantilly 'Chantilly-style molded cream', as early as 1768.  Modern mousses, including mousse au chocolat, are a continuation of this tradition.

Cream whipped in a whipping siphon with nitrous oxide was invented in the 1930s by both Charles Getz, working with G. Frederick Smith, and Marshall Reinecke. Both filed patents, which were later litigated. The Getz patents were originally deemed invalid, but were upheld on appeal.

Crème Chantilly

Crème Chantilly is another name for whipped cream. The difference between "whipped cream" and "crème Chantilly" is not systematic. Some authors distinguish between the two, with crème Chantilly being sweetened, and whipped cream not. However, most authors treat the two as synonyms, with both being sweetened, neither being sweetened, or treating sweetening as optional. Many authors use only one of the two names (for the sweetened or unsweetened version), so it is not clear whether they distinguish the two.

The invention of crème Chantilly is often credited incorrectly, and without evidence, to François Vatel, maître d'hôtel at the Château de Chantilly in the mid-17th century. But the name Chantilly is first connected with whipped cream in the mid-18th century, around the time that the Baronne d'Oberkirch praised the "cream" served at a lunch at the Hameau de Chantilly—but did not say what exactly it was, or call it Chantilly cream.

The names "crème Chantilly", "crème de Chantilly", "crème à la Chantilly", or "crème fouettée à la Chantilly" only become common in the 19th century. In 1806, the first edition of Viard's Cuisinier Impérial mentions neither "whipped" nor "Chantilly" cream, but the 1820 edition mentions both.

The name Chantilly was probably used because the château had become a symbol of refined food; the word Chantilly by itself has since become a culinary shorthand for whipped cream.

Imitation whipped cream

Imitations of whipped cream, often called whipped topping (occasionally whip topping), are commercially available. They may be used to avoid dairy ingredients, to provide extended shelf life, or to reduce the price — although some popular brands cost twice as much as whipped cream.

The earliest known recipe for a non-dairy whipped cream was published by Ella Eaton Kellogg in 1904; consistent with her Seventh-day Adventist practices, it replaced cream with almond butter. Based on research sponsored by Henry Ford, a soy-based whip topping was commercialized by Delsoy Products by 1945. Delsoy did not survive, but Bob Rich's Rich Products frozen "Whip Topping", also introduced in 1945, succeeded. Rich Products topping was reformulated with coconut oil replacing soy oil in 1956.

Artificial whipped topping normally contains some mixture of partially hydrogenated oil, sweeteners, water, and stabilizers and emulsifiers added to prevent syneresis. In regulatory contexts, this is called "whipped edible oil topping".

It may be sold frozen in plastic tubs (e.g., Cool Whip), or in aerosol containers or in liquid form in cartons, reminiscent of real whipping cream.

Uses

Whipped cream is a popular topping for fruit and desserts such as pie, ice cream (especially sundaes), cupcakes, cakes, milkshakes, waffles, hot chocolate, cheesecakes, Jello and puddings. It is also served on coffee, especially in the Viennese coffee house tradition, where coffee with whipped cream is known as Melange mit Schlagobers. Whipped cream is used as an ingredient in many desserts, for example as a filling for profiteroles and layer cakes.

It is often piped onto a dish using a pastry bag to create decorative shapes.

Mousse is usually based on whipped cream, often with added egg white foam. Similarly,  is made of whipped cream and whipped egg whites.  and  include whipped cream and whipped fromage frais, and are typically served in a cheese drainer, recalling the former process of draining whipped cream.

See also

 Alcohol-infused whipped cream
 Dream Whip a powdered dessert topping mix
 Schlagobers Richard Strauss' "Whipped Cream" ballet

References

Dairy products
Desserts
Toppings